Heraclia is a genus of moths of the family Noctuidae. The genus was erected by Jacob Hübner in 1820.

Species
 Heraclia abacata (Karsch, 1892)
 Heraclia aemulatrix (Westwood, 1881)
 Heraclia africana (Butler, 1875)
 Heraclia aisha (Kirby, 1891)
 Heraclia annulata (Aurivillius, 1925)
 Heraclia atrifusa (Hampson, 1912)
 Heraclia atriventralis (Hampson, 1910)
 Heraclia aurantiaca Kiriakoff, 1975
 Heraclia aurea (Wichgraf, 1918)
 Heraclia bucholzi (Plötz, 1880)
 Heraclia butleri (Walker, 1869)
 Heraclia catori (Jordan, 1904)
 Heraclia contigua (Walker, 1854)
 Heraclia deficiens (Mabille, 1891)
 Heraclia durbania (Stoneham, 1963)
 Heraclia elongata (Bartel, 1903)
 Heraclia flavipennis (Bartel, 1903)
 Heraclia flavisignata (Hampson, 1912)
 Heraclia geryon (Fabricius, 1781)
 Heraclia gruenbergi (Wichgraf, 1911)
 Heraclia hornimani (Druce, 1880)
 Heraclia houyjensis (Wichgraf, 1918)
 Heraclia hypercompoides (Butler, 1895)
 Heraclia jacksoni Kiriakoff, 1975
 Heraclia jugans (Jordan, 1913)
 Heraclia karschii (Holland, 1897)
 Heraclia kivuensis Kiriakoff, 1973
 Heraclia limbomaculata (Strand, 1909)
 Heraclia lomata (Karsch, 1892)
 Heraclia longipennis (Walker, 1854)
 Heraclia medeba (Druce, 1880)
 Heraclia monslunensis (Hampson, 1901)
 Heraclia mozambica (Mabille, 1890)
 Heraclia nandi Kiriakoff, 1974
 Heraclia nigridorsa (Mabille, 1890)
 Heraclia nobela Kiriakoff, 1974
 Heraclia pallida (Walker, 1854)
 Heraclia pampata Kiriakoff, 1974
 Heraclia pardalina (Walker, 1869)
 Heraclia perdix (Druce, 1887)
 Heraclia poggei (Dewitz, 1879)
 Heraclia superba (Butler, 1875) – superb false tiger moth
 Heraclia terminatis (Walker, 1856)
 Heraclia thruppi (Butler, [1886])
 Heraclia viettei Kiriakoff, 1973
 Heraclia xanthopyga (Mabille, 1890)
 Heraclia zenkeri (Karsch, 1895)

References

Agaristinae